Sankri is a hamlet (small village) situated at an altitude of 1950 m above sea level in Mori Tehsil, Uttarkashi district, Uttarakhand, India. Part of the Govind Balabh Pant Wildlife Sanctuary, Sankri is 25 km away from the sub-district headquarters Mori and 195 km from the district headquarters Uttarkashi. Barkot is the closest town to Sankri at approximately 86 km. The total geographical area of Sankri village is 40.01 hectares. According to 2009 statistics, Saur is the gram panchayat of Sankri, and according to 2011 census information, the location code or village code of Sankari village is 040230.

Sankri is also considered as the base camp of several treks like Har Ki Doon, Kedarkantha, Ruinsara Tal, Bali Pass, Borasu Pass, Dev Kyara Bugyal, Bharadsar Lake, Saru Tal, Nalgan Pass, Maldaru and is also the base village of various mountain peaks such as Swargarohini Ranges, Banderpunch, Black Peak, etc.

One has to go through Dehradun to reach Sankri. The route from Dehradun to Sankri is 200 km long that can be completed by taxis or government buses from Dehradun. There is no road beyond Sankri village; hence this village is also considered as the last road of Govind Wildlife Sanctuary. Unlike other villages present in Uttarakhand, the lush greenery of the Himalayan valley is seen inside Sankri. The local culture of this village is also quite different as the people living there are known as Himalayan people. Sankri is the only village present in Uttarakhand, situated between mountains, deodar forests, and rivers like Supin, Tons and Kedarganga.

Weather 
In January and February, Sankri receives a lot of snowfall and the village is completely covered with snow, but the weather is unpredictable. However, due to the population and frequent travelers, the snow does not last more than a few days or weeks. The climate of this village is estimated to be in the range of 10 to 15 degrees and the annual precipitation is about 1328 mm.

Population 
The total population of Sankri is 270, of which 153 are men and 117 are women. There are about 77 houses in the village of Sankri.

References 

Villages in Uttarkashi district